Brezovci is a settlement in the Municipality of Dornava in northeastern Slovenia. It lies on the edge of the Slovene Hills, east of Dornava. The area is part of the traditional region of Styria. It is now included with the rest of the municipality in the Drava Statistical Region.

References

External links
Brezovci on Geopedia

Populated places in the Municipality of Dornava